Klick Records was a music label based in London, England. It was founded in 1975 by former Trojan Records employees Joe Sinclair and Desmond Bryan, along with Larry Sevitt. Klik described itself as a "progressive Black Music Company, specialising in rebel-dread Reggae, modern Soul and Disco sounds."

Before the company's demise in 1977, it released several dozen singles and albums which were distributed first by Island Records, and then RCA Records. Among the artists whose recordings it released in the UK were Willie Lindo, Tapper Zukie, Big Youth, John Holt (singer), Pablo Moses, and Eric Gale. Most Klik products were originally recorded in Jamaica for release by other labels.

Klik Records ceased operations in 1977.

References

External links
 Klik Albums Retrieved 16 February 2015
 Klik Retrieved 16 February 2015

British record labels
Record labels established in 1975
Reggae record labels